Vernon John Gordon Couttie (7 May 1891 – 12 August 1967) was an Australian rules footballer who played with St Kilda in the Victorian Football League (VFL).

Notes

External links 

1891 births
1967 deaths
Australian rules footballers from Victoria (Australia)
St Kilda Football Club players
Australian military personnel of World War I
Australian rules footballers from Ballarat
Military personnel from Victoria (Australia)